The Spirit of 176 is a 1988 album by the jazz pianists George Shearing and Hank Jones.

Reception

Scott Yanow reviewed the album for Allmusic and wrote of Shearing and Jones that "Their unique matchup as a two-piano duo on this Concord release works surprisingly well for the two pianists manage to stay out of each other's way and the ensembles are not overcrowded. ...the results are swinging and tasteful. This somewhat obscure Concord CD is worth investigating".

Track listing 
 "Oh! Look at Me Now" (Joe Bushkin, John DeVries) – 3:26
 "Angel Eyes" (Earl Brent, Matt Dennis) – 3:53
 "I Mean You" (Coleman Hawkins, Thelonious Monk) – 3:18
 "You Don't Know What Love Is" (Gene DePaul, Don Raye) – 4:22
 "To Hank Jones" (George Shearing) – 4:26
 "Minor Contention" (Hank Jones) – 2:44
 "Ask Me Now" (Monk) – 5:00
 "Triste" (Antônio Carlos Jobim) – 3:25
 "Take a Good Look" (Jones) – 3:21
 "Sweet Lorraine" (Cliff Burwell, Mitchell Parish) – 3:57
 "Young No More" (Frank Metis) – 5:28
 "Lonely Moments" (Mary Lou Williams) – 4:19
 "Star Eyes" (DePaul, Raye) – 4:02
 "Confirmation" (Charlie Parker) – 3:43

Personnel 
Hank Jones, George Shearing – piano
Production
Abbey Anna, Paul Francis – art direction
Andy Renner – assistant
Herbert Waltl – associate producer
Fred Jacobs – compilation editing
Dave Fischer – cover photo
Phil Edwards – engineer, mixing, mixing engineer
Ted White – engineer
John Burk – executive producer, producer
Glen Barros – executive producer
Nat Hentoff – liner notes
Graeme Brown – mastering engineer
George Horn – mastering
Jill Simonsen – package design
Carl Jefferson – producer
Nick Phillips – producer
Valerie Whitesell – production coordination

References

1988 albums
Albums produced by Carl Jefferson
Concord Records albums
George Shearing albums
Hank Jones albums
Instrumental duet albums